Halina Lacheta is a Polish luger who competed in the late 1950s. She won the bronze medal in the men's doubles event at the 1958 FIL World Luge Championships in Krynica, Poland.

References
Hickok sports information on World champions in luge and skeleton.
SportQuick.com information on World champions in luge 

Polish female lugers
Possibly living people
Year of birth missing
Place of birth missing (living people)